Pita is a 1991 Indian Hindi-language film based on Swedish playwright August Strindberg's 1887 play The Father. Directed by Govind Nihalani, the film stars Vimal Bhagat, Satyadev Dubey, Dina Pathak, Irrfan and Shikha Rai.

Plot
In disagreement with her husband on how her daughter should be raised and what she should become, the central character of a woman thinks that if she declares her husband insane she would be able to decide for her daughter. Acting on this she sows seeds of confusion in the mind of his husband that he might not be the father of their daughter. The husband starts to believe and actually goes insane and his wife gets the custody of their daughter.

Cast
Vimal Bhagat
Satyadev Dubey
Dina Pathak
Irrfan
Shikha Rai

References

External links

1991 films
Films based on works by August Strindberg
1990s Hindi-language films
Films directed by Govind Nihalani